Nagaharu (written: 長治) is a masculine Japanese given name. Notable people with the name include:

, Japanese daimyō and samurai
, Japanese film critic and television personality

Japanese masculine given names